The 1966–67 snooker season was the series of professional snooker tournaments played between July 1966 and June 1967. The following table outlines the results for the season's events.


Calendar

New professional
John Spencer turned professional, becoming the first new professional since Rex Williams in 1951.

Notes

References

1966
1966 in snooker
1967 in snooker